In automata theory, a Muller automaton is a type of an ω-automaton. 
The acceptance condition separates a Muller automaton from other ω-automata.
The Muller automaton is defined using a Muller acceptance condition, i.e. the set of all states visited infinitely often must be an element of the acceptance set. Both deterministic and non-deterministic Muller automata recognize the ω-regular languages. They are named after David E. Muller, an American mathematician and computer scientist, who invented them in 1963.

Formal definition
Formally, a deterministic Muller-automaton is a tuple A = (Q,Σ,δ,q0,F) that consists of the following information:
 Q is a finite set. The elements of Q are called the states of A.
 Σ is a finite set called the alphabet of A.
 δ: Q × Σ → Q is a function, called the transition function of A.
 q0 is an element of Q, called the initial state.
 F is a set of sets of states. Formally, F ⊆ P(Q) where P(Q) is powerset of Q. F defines the acceptance condition. A accepts exactly those runs in which the set of infinitely often occurring states is an element of F

In a non-deterministic Muller automaton, the transition function δ is replaced with a transition relation Δ that returns a set of states and the initial state q0 is replaced by a set of initial states Q0. Generally, 'Muller automaton' refers to a non-deterministic Muller automaton.

For more comprehensive formalisation look at ω-automaton.

Equivalence with other ω-automata

The Muller automata are equally expressive as parity automata, Rabin automata, Streett automata, and non-deterministic Büchi automata, to mention some, and strictly more expressive than the deterministic Büchi automata. The equivalence of the above automata and non-deterministic Muller automata can be shown very easily as the accepting conditions of these automata can be emulated using the acceptance condition of Muller automata and vice versa. 

McNaughton's theorem demonstrates the equivalence of non-deterministic Büchi automaton and deterministic Muller automaton. Thus, deterministic and non-deterministic Muller automata are equivalent in terms of the languages they can accept.

Transformation to non-deterministic Muller automata

Following is a list of automata constructions that each transforms a type of ω-automata to a non-deterministic Muller automaton.

From Büchi automata
If  is the set of final states in a Büchi automaton with the set of states , we can construct a Muller automaton with same set of states, transition function and initial state with the Muller accepting condition as F = { X | X ∈ P(Q) ∧ X ∩ B ≠ }.

From Rabin automata/parity automata
Note that this covers the case of parity automata too, as the parity acceptance condition can be expressed as a Rabin acceptance condition easily.

From Streett automata
The Streett conditions  can be emulated by constructing the acceptance set in the Muller automaton as all sets  that satisfy , for all j.

Transformation to deterministic Muller automata

From Büchi automaton
McNaughton's theorem provides a procedure to transform any non-deterministic Büchi automaton into a deterministic Muller automaton.

References

Automata on Infinite Words Slides for a tutorial by Paritosh K. Pandya.
 Yde Venema (2008) Lectures on the Modal μ-calculus; the 2006 version was presented at The 18th European Summer School in Logic, Language and Information

Finite automata
Model checking